Whitsome is a small rural village in the Scottish Borders area of Scotland, on the B6437, near Duns, Fogo, Ladykirk, Leitholm and Swinton.

Place-name meaning
Whitsome derives from Old English hwit-husum "at the white houses". This may refer to white stone buildings, or houses painted white. The name has been recorded as the following over the centuries:
 æt hwitum husum, 984 (literally "at the white houses, -um being dative plural).
 Huuithusum, 1038 (double u was written since "w" could not be pronounced by the author)
 Witsum, 1124 (contracted form)

See also
List of places in the Scottish Borders
List of places in Scotland

External links

RCAHMS site record for Whitsome
Gazetteer for Scotland: Parish of Whitsome
Excavation of cist burial, Leetside Farm, Whitsome
 Forestry Commission: Consultation with Edrom, Allanton and Whitsome Community Council
GENUKI: History of Whitsome
Borders Family History Society: Whitsome
GEOGRAPH image: Whitsome Church

Villages in the Scottish Borders